The Ninetieth Minnesota Legislature was the legislature of the U.S. state of Minnesota from January 3, 2017 to January 7, 2019. It was composed of the Senate and the House of Representatives, based on the results of the 2016 Senate election and the 2016 House election. It first convened and held its regular session in Saint Paul from January 3 to May 22, 2017, and from February 20 to May 20, 2018. A special session to complete unfinished business was held from May 23 to 26, 2017.

Major events
 January 23, 2017: Governor Mark Dayton delivered his 2017 State of the State address in a joint session. Near the end of his speech, Dayton collapsed and was attended to by, among others, state senators and physicians Scott Jensen and Matt Klein.
 February 22, 2017: A joint session was held to elect regents of the University of Minnesota.
 March 14, 2018: Governor Dayton delivered his 2018 State of the State address in a joint session.
 May 10, 2018: A joint session was held to elect a regent of the University of Minnesota.

Major legislation

Enacted
 January 26, 2017: Health insurance premium subsidy act
 March 7, 2017: Off-sale intoxicating liquor sales on Sunday act
 April 4, 2017: Reinsurance act
 May 18, 2017: Real ID implementation act
 Omnibus appropriations acts:
 May 30, 2017: Omnibus agriculture act
 May 30, 2017: Omnibus higher education act
 May 30, 2017: Omnibus environment and natural resources act
 May 30, 2017: Omnibus jobs, economic development, and energy act
 May 30, 2017: Omnibus judiciary and public safety act
 May 30, 2017: Omnibus transportation act
 May 30, 2017: Omnibus state government act
 Two appropriations line-item vetoed.
 May 30, 2017: Omnibus education act
 May 30, 2017: Omnibus health and human services act
 May 30, 2017: Omnibus legacy act
 May 30, 2017: Environment and natural resources trust fund appropriations act
 May 30, 2017: Omnibus tax act
 May 30, 2017: Omnibus capital investment "bonding" act
 February 26, 2018: Legislative appropriations act
 March 22, 2018: Minnesota Licensing and Registration System supplemental appropriations act
 April 26, 2018: Service animal misrepresentation act
 May 29, 2018: Outdoor heritage fund appropriations act
 May 30, 2018: Omnibus capital investment "bonding" act
 One appropriation line-item vetoed. 
 May 31, 2018: Omnibus public pensions act

Proposed
Boldface indicates the bill was passed by its house of origin.

 Academic balance policy bill (/)
 Cell phone use while driving bill (/)
 Civil liability for public safety response costs bill (/)
 Defense of dwelling and person bill (/)
 Female genital mutilation bill (/)
 Firearm permit to carry repeal bill (/)
 Firearm transfer background check bill (/)
 Gun violence protective order bill (/)
 K–12 education scholarship donation tax credit bill (/)
 Medical Assistance work requirement bill (/)
 Minnesota African American Family Preservation Act (/)
 Opioid addiction prevention and treatment bill (/)
 Proposed constitutional amendment allowing recreational marijuana bill
 Proposed constitutional amendment dedicating motor vehicle parts sales tax revenue to roads and bridges bill (/)
 Recreational marijuana bill (/)
 Semiautomatic assault weapon minimum possession age bill (/)
 Sexual harassment bill (/)
 Uniform State Labor Standards Act (/)

Vetoed
Boldface indicates the act was passed by both houses.

2017 
 May 10, 2017: Abortion public funding prohibition act (/)
 May 10, 2017: Abortion facility license act (/)
 Omnibus appropriations acts:
 May 12, 2017: Omnibus agriculture act (/)
 May 12, 2017: Omnibus environment and natural resources act (/)
 May 12, 2017: Omnibus education act (/)
 May 12, 2017: Omnibus state government act (/)
 May 12, 2017: Omnibus health and human services act (/)
 May 15, 2017: Omnibus transportation act (/)
 May 15, 2017: Omnibus judiciary and public safety act (/)
 May 15, 2017: Omnibus jobs, economic development, and energy act (/)
 May 15, 2017: Omnibus higher education act (/)
 May 15, 2017: Omnibus tax act (/)
 May 18, 2017: Teacher licensing act (/)

2017, 1st Special Session
 May 30, 2017: Omnibus labor act (/)

2018 
 May 17, 2018: Omnibus tax act (/)
 May 19, 2018: Obstruction of freeways act (/)
 May 23, 2018: Omnibus supplemental appropriations act (/)
 May 23, 2018: Omnibus tax act (/)
 May 30, 2018: Metropolitan Council act (/)

Summary of actions 
In this Legislature, all acts were approved (signed) by Governor Mark Dayton, with the notable exceptions of H.F. No. 809, an act that would have prohibited public funding of abortions; H.F. No. 812, an act that would have required facilities that perform abortions to be licensed; the first set of acts appropriating money for the state budget; H.F. No. 4, the first 2017 omnibus tax act; H.F. No. 140, an act that would have changed how public school teachers are licensed; 2017, First Special Session S.F. No. 3, an act that would notably have prohibited local governments from setting a higher minimum wage and requiring greater benefits for private sector employees than what is required by state law; H.F. No. 4385, the first 2018 omnibus tax act; H.F. No. 390, an act that would have increased penalties for obstructing freeways, airport public roadways, and interfering with public transit; S.F. No. 3656, the omnibus supplemental appropriations act; H.F. No. 947, the second 2018 omnibus tax act; and S.F. No. 2809, an act that would have changed the composition of the Metropolitan Council from gubernatorial appointees to county and city elected officials—all of which were vetoed. In Laws 2017, First Special Session chapter 4, the omnibus state government appropriations act, two appropriations for the Senate and the House of Representatives were line-item vetoed. Chapter 13, the reinsurance act, became law without the governor's signature.

In total, 33 acts were vetoed, three items of appropriation in two acts were line-item vetoed, and two acts became law without the governor's signature. No acts or items were enacted by the Legislature over the governor's veto. After the adjournment of the 2017, First Special Session—legislative leaders sued Governor Dayton over the validity of his line-item vetoes for legislative appropriations. The ensuing court case, Ninetieth Minnesota State Senate v. Dayton, proceeded to the Minnesota Supreme Court; the Court upheld the governor's vetoes.

Political composition
Resignations and new members are discussed in the "Changes in membership" section below.

Senate

House of Representatives

Leadership

Senate
 President: Michelle Fischbach (R), until May 25, 2018
 President pro tempore: Warren Limmer (R)

Majority (Republican) leadership
 Majority Leader: Paul Gazelka
 Deputy Majority Leaders:
 Michelle Benson
 Jeremy Miller
 Assistant Majority Leaders:
 Gary Dahms
 Bill Ingebrigtsen
 Warren Limmer
 Eric Pratt

Minority (DFL) leadership
 Minority Leader: Tom Bakk
 Assistant Minority Leaders:
 Jeff Hayden, from January 5, 2017
 Susan Kent, from January 5, 2017
 Carolyn Laine, from January 24, 2017
 Minority Whips:
 Kent Eken, from January 24, 2017
 John Hoffman, from January 24, 2017
 Ann Rest, from January 24, 2017

House of Representatives
 Speaker: Kurt Daudt (R)
 Speaker pro tempore: Tony Albright (R)

Majority (Republican) leadership
 Majority Leader: Joyce Peppin, until July 2, 2018
 Majority Whip: Ron Kresha
 Assistant Majority Leaders:
 Dan Fabian
 Kelly Fenton
 Randy Jessup
 Jim Nash
 Marion O'Neill
 Roz Peterson

Minority (DFL) leadership
 Minority Leader: Melissa Hortman
 Deputy Minority Leaders:
 Jon Applebaum
 Paul Marquart
 Rena Moran
 Assistant Minority Leaders:
 Rob Ecklund
 Mike Freiberg
 Laurie Halverson
 Ben Lien
 Ilhan Omar
 Dave Pinto

Members

Senate

House of Representatives

Changes in membership

Senate

House of Representatives

Committees

Senate

House of Representatives

Administrative officers

Senate
 Secretary: Cal Ludeman
 First Assistant Secretary: Colleen Pacheco
 Second Assistant Secretary: Mike Linn
 Third Assistant Secretary: Jessica Tupper
 Engrossing Secretary: Melissa Mapes
 Sergeant at Arms: Sven Lindquist
 Assistant Sergeant at Arms: Marilyn Logan
 Chaplain: Mike Smith (2017)

House of Representatives
 Chief Clerk: Patrick Murphy
 First Assistant Chief Clerk: Tim Johnson
 Second Assistant Chief Clerk: Gail Romanowski
 Desk Clerk: Marilee Davis
 Legislative Clerk: David Surdez
 Chief Sergeant at Arms: Bob Meyerson
 Assistant Sergeant at Arms: Erica Brynildson
 Assistant Sergeant at Arms: Andrew Olson
 Index Clerk: Carl Hamre

Notes

References

External links
 Legislature
2017 Regular Session Laws
 2017, 1st Special Session Laws
 2018 Regular Session Laws
 Senate
List of bill summaries prepared by the Senate Counsel, Research and Fiscal Analysis Office
 Fiscal tracking spreadsheets prepared by the Senate Counsel, Research and Fiscal Analysis Office
 House of Representatives
List of bill summaries prepared by the House Research Department
 List of act summaries prepared by the House Research Department
 Fiscal tracking spreadsheets prepared by the House Fiscal Analysis Department

Minnesota legislative sessions
2010s in Minnesota
2017 in Minnesota
2018 in Minnesota
2017 U.S. legislative sessions
2018 U.S. legislative sessions